Tell Sukas (ancient Shuksi or Suksi) is a Late Bronze Age archaeological mound on the Eastern Mediterranean coast about  south of Jableh, Syria.

Overview
Tell Sukas was located at the center of the fertile plain of Jableh on a hill with access to two natural harbors. There is evidence of an earlier Neolithic settlement at the site dating back to the seventh or sixth millennium BC.  The site was identified as ancient Suksi, which was mentioned in the Ugarit tablets and was probably the southernmost port of the Kingdom of Ugarit. The Bronze Age settlement was probably destroyed along with the capital, Ugarit, during the Bronze Age collapse. The site was reused shortly thereafter and commercial activity at the Iron Age settlement can be traced again to at least the tenth century BC, when it became the port of Luhuti, A Phoenician settlement was established in the eighth century BC and the town thrived as a Greek trading outpost between c. 850 BC and c. 550 BC, when it was destroyed by the Babylonians. Recent excavations reveal that the site was inhabited again by the Phoenicians between 380 and 69 BC until it was destroyed again, possibly by an earthquake. It was later re-occupied for a short period by the Crusaders.

Excavation
The site was excavated in 1958–1963 by the Danish Carlsberg Expedition to Phoenicia under P.J. Riis. Excavations uncovered an early Iron Age cemetery south of the tell which was dated to between the 13th and 10th century BC. Excavations also uncovered a large seventh-century Phoenician temple. The abundance of Greek pottery and the discovery of Greek burial grounds suggest that the city became a permanent Hellenic outpost by 600 BC.

References

Citations

Bibliography

Phoenician cities
Former populated places in Syria
Phoenician temples
Bronze Age sites in Syria
Neolithic sites in Syria
Iron Age sites in Syria
Archaeological sites in Latakia Governorate
Ugarit